Marples is a surname. Notable people with the surname include:

Brian John Marples (1907–1997), British and New Zealand zoologist
Chris Marples (footballer) (born 1964), former English footballer and first-class cricketer
David R. Marples, Canadian historian
Ernest Marples PC (1907–1978), British Conservative politician, Postmaster General and Minister of Transport
Fred Marples (1885–1945), Canadian sports executive in ice hockey and athletics
George Marples (1883–1947), English cricketer
Nigel Marples (born 1985), Canadian soccer player
Simon Marples (born 1975), English soccer player
Stan Marples, professional ice hockey player
William Marples & Sons, English tool-maker